Camponotus vicinus is a species of ant in the subfamily formicinae. C. vicinus is widespread throughout western North America, from Alaska, south to Mexico, and east to Texas and Manitoba. Unlike its wood nesting "carpenter ant" relatives, Camponotus vicinus is typically found nesting in the soil under stones and other objects. The giant ants in the 1954 film Them! are identified as C. vicinus, despite multiple anatomical differences, including the presence of a sting, which is absent in Formicine ants.

References

Further reading

External links

 

vicinus
Articles created by Qbugbot
Insects described in 1870